Samuel Gurney (1816–1882) was a banker from the Gurney family. He served as independent Member of Parliament for Penryn & Falmouth from 1857 to 1868 but never spoke. He was also the first Chairman of the London and Provincial District Telegraph Co. Ltd. in 1859 (originally the London District Telegraph Co. Ltd.).  He was president of the National Association for the relief of British Miners and, along with Edward Thomas Wakefield, founder and chairman of the Metropolitan Drinking Fountain and Cattle Trough Association

Gurney was the second son of Samuel Gurney (1786–1856), also a banker.

References

1816 births
1882 deaths
Members of the Parliament of the United Kingdom for Penryn and Falmouth
English bankers
UK MPs 1857–1859
UK MPs 1859–1865
UK MPs 1865–1868
Samuel
19th-century English businesspeople